Paweł Janeczek (16 April 1973, in Łódź – 10 April 2010) was a Polish officer of Government Protection Bureau.

He died in the 2010 Polish Air Force Tu-154 crash near Smolensk on 10 April 2010. He was posthumously awarded the Order of Polonia Restituta.

References

1973 births
2010 deaths
Officers of the Order of Polonia Restituta
Burials at Powązki Military Cemetery
Victims of the Smolensk air disaster
Military personnel from Łódź